Robbie Hedges was the chief of the Peoria tribe of Indians of Oklahoma. In 2000 she was the first woman to be elected to the position. Hedges, a former office manager, found that there were no other candidates when Chief Joe Goforth resigned. She decided to run in part based on the tradition of tribal service set by her grandmother, who had lived to age 108.

References

20th-century Native American women
20th-century Native Americans
21st-century Native American women
21st-century Native Americans
Female Native American leaders
Living people
Peoria people
Year of birth missing (living people)